Devonshire Dock Hall (often abbreviated to DDH) is a large indoor shipbuilding and assembly complex that forms part of the BAE Systems shipyard in the Barrow Island area of Barrow-in-Furness, Cumbria, England.

History
Constructed between 1982 and 1986 by Alfred McAlpine plc for Vickers Shipbuilding and Engineering, DDH was built on land that was created by infilling part of Devonshire Dock with 2.4 million tonnes of sand pumped from nearby Roosecote Sands. The purpose of the indoor shipbuilding facility was to protect vessels from external weather conditions and prevent satellites from photographing secret technologies involved. DDH provides a controlled environment for ship and submarine assembly, and avoids the difficulties caused by building on the slope of traditional slipways. Outside the hall, a 24,300-tonne capacity shiplift allows completed vessels to be lowered into the water independently of the tide. Vessels can also be lifted out of the water and transferred to the hall. The shiplift was the largest in the world upon completion. The first use of the DDH was for construction of HMS Triumph (S93), followed by the Vanguard-class submarines nuclear-powered ballistic missile submarines (SSBNs) (and ). The shipyard is currently constructing the s the first of which HMS Astute was launched in 2007.

Structure and dimensions

DDH is the second largest indoor shipbuilding construction complex of its kind in Europe after Dockhalle 2 of Meyer Werft in Germany. It is visible from miles around, most notably from the Blackpool Promenade which is over 20 miles away.

Future expansion
DDH is at the centre of a £300 million redevelopment of the shipyard that commenced in late 2014. A large extension to the hall is under-construction to enable construction of the Dreadnought-class submarines, the replacement for the Vanguard-class SSBNs. Proposals were also put forward in 2019 to re-clad the DDH in its entirety to extend the lifetime of the building. The projects are the largest investment at the shipyard since the construction of DDH itself.

See also
 Vickers Shipbuilding and Engineering
 BAE Systems Maritime – Submarines
 UK Trident programme

References

Sources

Devonshire Dock Hall
Devonshire Dock Hall
Devonshire Dock Hall
Devonshire Dock Hall
Devonshire Dock Hall
Devonshire Dock Hall
Devonshire Dock Hall